Kordbastan (also Romanized as Kordbastān and Kord-e Bostān; also known as Gard Bestān, Gord Bastān, and Gord-e Bostān) is a village in Dashtab Rural District, in the Central District of Baft County, Kerman Province, Iran. At the 2006 census, its population was 115, in 29 families. one of the most important family in the baft county is shamsi, which are living in this village.

Important personalities

Mohsen shamsi

References 

Populated places in Baft County